Dalmianagar is a town that had one of the oldest and biggest industry in India. It is situated at Dehri-on-Sone on the banks of the Son River in Rohtas district of Bihar. This is a city and a Municipality in Rohtas district in the state of Bihar, India, combinedly known as Dehri-Dalmianagar Nagar Palika.

Dalmianagar
The Industrial town of Dalmianagar was founded by the industrialist Ramkrishna Dalmia, a doyen of business in 20th century India and founder of the Dalmia Group. He was assisted by his younger brother Jaidayal Dalmia and son in law Sahu Shanti Prasad Jain in establishing many factories of Rohtas Industries Ltd. in Dalmianagar.

Shanti Prasad Jain took over Rohtas Industries Ltd. from his father-in-law, and under his stewardship, Dalmianagar developed into a massive industrial town from the 1940s till the 1980s with factories producing sugar, cement, paper, chemicals, vanaspati,  etc. employing top professionals of the country. Dalmianagar boasted of vast housing colony, gardens, clubs, schools, market complexes, and hospitals for its employees. Rohtas Industries had their own private aircraft in those days and a small air-field near Dalmianagar.

The prosperity of Dalmianagar started to decline in the mid 1970s as the law and order situation in this industrial town began to worsen. Local mafia indulged in dacoity and kidnapping. Slowly, executives and professionals began to leave and the factories were mismanaged. By the mid 1980s factories started to shut down. Massive electricity bills remained unpaid by Rohtas Industries Ltd. to the State Electricity Board.

There were irregularities in payment of salaries and wages to employees. By the 1990s Dalmianagar looked like a ghost town.

Rohtas Industries Dalmianagar and Dehri-Rohtas Light Railway

The Dehri Rohtas Light Railway started off as Dehri Rohtas Tramway Company in 1907 promoted by The Octavius Steel and Company of Calcutta. The original contract was to build a 40 km feeder line from Rohtas to the East Indian Railway's Delhi - Calcutta trunk route at Dehri-on-Sone. Soon thereafter, the tramway company was incorporated as a light railway in order to acquire the assets of the then defunct Dwara - Therria Light Railway in Assam. The DRLR opened to traffic in 1911 and was booming by 1913-14 when it carried over 50,000 passengers and 90,000 tons of freight, the goods traffic mainly consisting of marble and stone. In 1927, a 2.5 km spur was added to Rohtasgarh Fort from Rohtas.

Rohtas Industries brought the line up to Tiura Pipradih by adding another 25 km to the DRLR, most of which passed through their property.

The DRLR operated a very mixed bag of locomotives. It started off with 0-6-2 tank locomotives, three of which arrived from the Dwara - Therria Railway after it closed in 1909. In the pre IRS years, it also used 0-6-0, 0-4-0 (Sentinel) and 0-6-4 variants of tank locomotives. After the wartime increase in traffic the railway brought as many as eight new ZB class 2-6-2 tender locomotives, orders for which were equally split between Hudswell Clarke and Krauss Maffei. At its peak, the DRLR used to operate two daily passengers trains in each direction from Dehri-on-Sone and Tiura Pipradih, a run of 67 km. Apart from this the railway carried marble and stone traffic to the mainline at Dehri on sone.

The railway also purchased several locomotives second hand notable among which were the A/1 class 2-8-4 tank locomotives built by Hudswell Clarke that arrived from the Pulgaon - Arvi system of Central Railway in 1959. Other unique locomotives that operated on DRLR were the several ex. Kalka - Simla Railway K class 2-6-2 tank engines by Kerr Stuart and 2-6-4 tank engines by Henschel that arrived from the Shahdara - Saharanpur Light Railway.

Due to the decline in traffic and competition to road in the late 1970s, the DRLR succumbed and closed to traffic on 16 July 1984.

Although the DRLR was a hotspot for narrow gauge enthusiasts from Europe in the 1970s, not much has appeared about it in the media since its closure. Brian Manktelow from London, England decided to unravel the fate of DRLR rolling stock in 1994 and visited the area. Below is a brief trip report:

An unannounced chance visit to the Rohtas Industries works 19 January 1994 proved very fruitful. After making personal contact with the management, we were given permission and a guide to visit all three sites.

Rohtas Industries BG (5'6") Shed

All seven locomotives were present in and around the shed. The three Jung tanks and the two old East Indian Railway (EIR) 0-6-4 tank locomotives were seen in very clean condition and ready to run. The fourth Jung tank engine was stripped down for long-term repair. The only really grubby looking loco of the lot was the Kerr Stuart saddle tank engine. Considering that these locomotives had not turned a wheel since the early 1980s, they were indeed in remarkable condition and everyone around spoken to was optimistic that one day the order will come for them to return to service and they will be ready for it!

Dehri Rohtas Railway 0-6-4T #6 Avonside works# 1982 of 1926. Dehri Rohtas Railway, 1980/01/14

Rhotas Industries Ltd. No.6 is a broad gauge 0-6-4 tank locomotive built by Vulcan Foundry in 1908. Prior to arriving at RIL in 1967, it worked for Eastern Railway as ER No.34308.

- All locomotives except No.1 & 3 were in good stored condition, looking very presentable
- No.1 was in poor condition - No.3 was completely dismantled, under prolonged heavy repair.

The Dehri Rohtas Light Railway (2'6") running shed

Here it was a completely different story. The railway closed on 16 July 1984 and since then nothing has moved. In the shed there were seven ZB class and three tank engines, one being Kalka Simla Railway. All were seen totally rusted through and shot to pieces with trees and vegetation running riot on, through and around them. They are still locked up and guarded and inaccessible without permission though.

- All locos were seen in poor or derelict condition
- No.7-9, 11-13 and No.15 were brought new by DRLR.
- No.24 is ex. Kalka Simla Railway, Northern Railway No.529
- RI 1 is ex Dwara - Therria Light Railway
- Most of the above locos still had their work plates intact
- The ZBs had raised brass numerals on the cabside and raised brass DRLR lettering on some of the tenders

The Dehri Rohtas Light Railway (2'6") running shed

The workshop is situated a little way outside of the town and was once again found locked up and guarded. Upon entry we found a time warp on the whole place. Two ZB locomotives were seen stripped down in mid repair and seven tank engines in various stages of dereliction. Also present was a small Orenstein & Koppel diesel engine that was locked up in a wire cage compound so details are not available. Also in the works were several items of coaching stock all dating back from the early 1900 and built in Leeds, England.

On the railway itself, the old exchange sidings with the mainline were packed with rusting narrow gauge wagons and boxcars. The entire track leading from the sidings and out into the country has been lifted but the track bed was quite easy to follow. The area around the loco shed and in the factory boundaries is still intact although fenced off and inaccessible from the local paths and roads. Vast amount of wagons still survive but all like the locos are in deplorable condition.

- This is how the workshop was left at closure of the line in 1984
- RI 2 is ex Dwara - Therria Light Railway
- No.23 is ex. Kalka Simla Railway, Northern Railway No.514

Education

The notable educational institutions in Dalmianagar are Model School, Dalmianagar High School.

References

Cities and towns in Rohtas district
Company towns in India
Dehri